Roger Clark (March 16, 1908 – October 13, 1978) was an American actor. He appeared in more than thirty films from 1941 to 1962.

Selected filmography

References

External links 

1908 births
1978 deaths
American male film actors
20th-century American male actors